Wilmore may refer to:

Places in the United States
 Wilmore, Kansas
 Wilmore, Kentucky
 Wilmore, Pennsylvania
Wilmore, West Virginia

People
 Barry E. Wilmore, NASA astronaut and United States Navy test pilot
 Larry Wilmore, television producer, writer, comedian, and actor

See also
 Willmore (disambiguation)